Eat My Dust! is a 1976 action film from New World Pictures starring Ron Howard.

Plot
When the clean-cut but rebellious son of a small-town sheriff steals the race car of a professional driver, the sheriff forms a motorized posse to recover the car.

Production
Ron Howard had written a comedy with his father called Tis the Season and raised half the budget from Australia. He met with Roger Corman and agreed to star in the film provided the producer agreed to co-finance Tis the Season. Corman was not enthusiastic about the comedy but said if Howard appeared in Eat My Dust! he would let the actor develop a second film which Howard would direct as well as star in. This was Grand Theft Auto (1977).

Charles Griffith directed the movie, which was shot in four weeks, although Howard's scenes were done in only ten days. It was originally titled The Car, and Griffith says he only suggested Eat My Dust! as a joke, but the marketing department at New World loved it.

Cast

Ron Howard as Hoover Niebold 
Christopher Norris as Darlene Kurtz 
Brad David as Billy B. Westerby 
Kathy O'Dare as Miranda Smith 
Clint Howard as George Poole Jr. 
Peter Isacksen as Junior Hale
Jessica Potter as Lallie Chandler 
Warren J. Kemmerling as Sheriff Harry Niebold
Charles Howerton as Dep. Jay Beah
Kedric Wolfe as Dep. Brookside
John Kramer as Dep. Sebastiani
W.L. Luckey as Dep. Jerry Gallo
Rance Howard as Deputy Clark
Dave Madden as Big Bubba Jones
Robert Broyles as Bud
Paul Bartel as Bruno Smith
Corbin Bernsen as Roy Puire
Don Brodie as Old Man Lewis

Release
The film premiered on April 7, 1976 in San Antonio. It then opened in 100 theatres in Texas on April 23, 1976.

Reception
TV Guide gave the movie two out of five stars, calling it below par, finding the movie enjoyable but mindless.

References

External links

 
 
 
 
 Alan Arkush on Eat My Dust! at Trailers From Hell

American action comedy films
American action adventure films
American adventure comedy films
1970s English-language films
American exploitation films
1970s exploitation films
Films about automobiles
1970s action adventure films
New World Pictures films
Films produced by Roger Corman
Films directed by Charles B. Griffith
Films with screenplays by Charles B. Griffith
American auto racing films
1970s action comedy films
1970s adventure comedy films
1976 comedy films
1976 films
1970s American films